Pero No Pasa Nada (Spanish for "But its no big deal") is the debut studio album by Spanish singer and songwriter Amaia. It was released through Universal Music Spain on 20 September 2019. Consisting of ten solo tracks, the album is "an ode to a person's twenties". Produced by Santiago Motorizado, Núria Graham and the singer herself it spawned four singles: "El Relámpago", "Quedará en Nuestra Mente", "Quiero Que Vengas" and "Nuevo Verano" as well as the promotional single "Nadie Podría Hacerlo". Pero No Pasa Nada debuted atop the Spanish PROMUSICAE albums chart.

Una Vuelta al Sol, a documentary starring Amaia that followed the production and composition of the album, was released on Amazon Prime Video on May 1, 2020. It received a nomination for Best Long Form Music Video at the 21st Latin Grammy Awards.

Background 
Since Amaia (then under the stage name of Amaia Romero) won the ninth edition of the Spanish talent show Operación Triunfo in early 2018, a lot of critical and popular expectation rose on how the singer would shape her first studio album. She expanded her pre-contract with Universal Music a month later. Once on a tour break later in the year Amaia stated that her debut album would be produced by Raül Refree who she admired since his work with Rosalía on her 2017 studio album Los Ángeles. A month later, Amaia was captured leaving the studio in New York City.

The album went through a lot of stages since the singer couldn't "find commodity" during the whole recording process. The urge her fans and Universal put on her didn't help either. In early 2019 rumors of a bad relationship between Amaia's manager Javier Romero and the director of the record label sparked online as disagreements in deadlines and decisions rose. Universal Music ordered Amaia to release a song before the tenth series of Operación Triunfo ended. To meet the deadline, the singer released "Un Nuevo Lugar", a very organic promotional single on 18 December 2018.

In January, Romero was confirmed to be part of the Warm Up Festival, which was set in Murcia in May 2019.  Narcís Rebollo, the president of Universal Music Spain, confirmed a month later that the album would be released in September. While being asked about the controversial creative process Rebollo stated that: "she wants to work in the whole part of composition, production, there are profiles of artists who have the ability or ease of making an album in six months and Amaia requires more time" and denied the rumors about a possible logistical dispute. Nevertheless, in April 2019 it was reported that an economic conflict between Rebollo and Refree caused the elimination of all the material produced by him, which became the reason of Amaia working with Motorizado. It was reported that over twenty songs were urgently composed in less than a month. In the documentary film Una Vuelta al Sol, Amaia explains that she didn't like the direction the first version of the album was heading to with Refree, due to the delicacy and mysticality of the music, which felt "too much for a debut album" for her.

On 26 April 2019, the singer finally announced the release of her first solo single. "El Relámpago" was released on May 3 and peaked at number 24 on the PROMUSICAE chart and stayed on the list for over three weeks. The first promotional single, "Nadie Podría Hacerlo" was released on 21 June 2019. The second official single was released on August 2, 2019, and titled "Quedará en nuestra mente". Amaia announced on 28 June 2019, through her respective social media profiles that her first studio album Pero No Pasa Nada would be released in September. She also revealed its cover, tracklist and tour. On 18 August 2019, the singer announced the official release date of the album.

Promotion

Singles 
The album's first official single, "El Relámpago", was announced on 26 April 2019, and released a week later. It received generally positive reviews for its epic instrumental and well-produced music video. The song peaked at 24 on the Spanish musical chart PROMUSICAE. It didn't last very long on the chart due to its low streaming numbers. A 7 inch single was released on 21 June 2019 with its B-side "Nadie Podría Hacerlo".

"Quedará en nuestra mente" was released on 2 August 2019, as the album's second single.

Promotional singles 
"Nadíe Podria Hacerlo" was released as the album's first promotional single on 21 June 2019.

Tour 

Pero No Pasa Nada Tour is the first solo concert tour by Spanish singer and songwriter Amaia. The tour will support her debut album Pero No Pasa Nada. It  began on October 5, 2019, at the Auditorio Baluarte in Pamplona. The tour is set to end on May 9, 2020, at the Cartuja Center in Seville. After a lot of speculation, the singer revealed the first fourteen dates of her debut tour on June 28, 2019, though her social media. Tour tickets went on sale on July 5, 2019. After less than a day, the tour's first show sold-out. A second show in Pamplona was announced on July 22 and also sold out in 24 hours. A second concert in Madrid was announced on September 5. The tickets for the concerts in Barcelona and Valencia also sold-out but there's no plan to add a second date in those cities. Two new corcerts in Huelva and Córdoba were announced on December 2, 2019. Due to phenomenal demand, Amaia announced during her performance at the Liceu that she would come back to the city in June. She'll also perform in Barcelona as part of Primavera Sound, one of the most important music festivals in the world and the most important in Spain.

In March 2020, after many space restrictions ordered by the Government of Spain to prevent the spread of COVID-19, many dates where postponed to fall or 2021 or were even cancelled.

Set list
This set list is from the concert on October 5, 2019, in Pamplona. It is not intended to represent all shows from the tour.

"Un Día Perdido"
"Todos Estos Años"
"Cosas interesantes para decir"
"Quedará En Nuestra Mente"
"La victoria"
"Medio Drogados" (Los Fresones Rebeldes cover)
"Última Vez"
"El Puerto" (written by Isaac Albéniz)
"Qué Nos Va a Pasar?" (La Buena Vida cover)
"Un Nuevo Lugar"
"Porque Apareciste"
"Nadie Podría Hacerlo"
"Cuando Estés Triste"
"Vas a Volverme Loca" (Natalia cover)
"Quiero Que Vengas"
"El Relámpago"
"Desde Que Te Has Ido" (Cecilia cover)
"Nuevo Verano"

Tour dates

Cancelled shows

Notes

Track listing 
Credits adapted from Tidal.

Charts

Weekly charts

Year-end charts

Release history

References 

2019 debut albums
Amaia (singer) albums